Juan Cruz Franzoni (born 17 October 1999) is an Argentine professional footballer who plays as a centre-forward for Villa Dálmine.

Club career
Franzoni got his senior career underway with Patronato in 2018. He was an unused substitute for an Primera División match with Rosario Central on 1 April, prior to making his debut on 6 May in the final moments of Patronato's last away game of 2017–18 versus Temperley; the club won both fixtures. He remained until the end of 2019–20, making a total of eleven appearances for the club; though all came as a substitute. October 2020 saw Franzoni join Primera Nacional's Sarmiento. He appeared off the bench in goalless draws with Villa Dálmine and Atlético de Rafaela, before departing in March 2021 to the aforementioned Villa Dálmine.

International career
In March 2018, Franzoni was called up to train with the Argentina U19s.

Career statistics
.

References

External links

1999 births
Living people
People from Paraná, Entre Ríos
Argentine footballers
Association football forwards
Argentine Primera División players
Primera Nacional players
Club Atlético Patronato footballers
Club Atlético Sarmiento footballers
Villa Dálmine footballers
Sportspeople from Entre Ríos Province